Ralph Pierre "Pete" LaCock Jr. (born January 17, 1952) is a former Major League Baseball first baseman/outfielder. He batted and threw left-handed. In 1975, LaCock hit the only grand slam of his career in the final appearance of St. Louis Cardinals pitcher Bob Gibson.

Career
LaCock was selected by the Chicago Cubs in the first round (20th pick overall) of the 1970 January Draft-Regular Phase out of William Howard Taft Charter High School.
His minor league career included leading the Texas League with 84 bases on balls while playing for the San Antonio Missions in 1971 and with 13 triples and 93 bases on balls while playing for the Midland Cubs in 1972.

Due to LaCock's success in the minor league system, he was promoted to the major leagues, where he played for the Cubs (1972–1976) and the Kansas City Royals (1977–1980). In 1981, he played in Japan for the Yokohama Taiyo Whales.

Over nine seasons (715 games), LaCock hit 27 home runs with 224 RBI and a batting average of .257. He was a good fielder at both first base and in the outfield, but never became an everyday player. LaCock was often used as a pinch hitter and/or defensive replacement, and sometimes as a designated hitter. He was granted free agency on October 24, 1980, though he never played another major league game.

In 1989, LaCock played for the St. Petersburg Pelicans and Winter Haven Super Sox of the Senior Professional Baseball Association.

Coaching
LaCock managed the Niagara Stars of the  Canadian Baseball League in 2003. After serving as the hitting coach for St. Joe Blacksnakes (now defunct) of the American Association of Independent Professional Baseball during the 2007 season, he was hired in 2008 as hitting coach for the Lincoln Saltdogs of the American Association, resigning his position in mid-July. Since then, LaCock has journeyed as a hitting coach with the Tucson Toros of the Golden Baseball League in 2009, the North American League Schaumburg Flyers in 2010, and the Kevin Costner owned Lake County Fielders (also of the North American League) in 2011.

In 2012, LaCock served as head coach of the Cronulla Sharks baseball club, in the New South Wales major league competition in Sydney, Australia. In 2012, he managed the Prescott Montezuma Federals of the Freedom Pro Baseball League.

Personal life
LaCock is the son of Hollywood Squares host Peter Marshall, as well as the nephew of actress Joanne Dru. Since his retirement from baseball, LaCock has competed in several marathons and triathlons, many of which raise funds for the Leukemia Society of America.

References

External links

LaCock will give players another view on hitting, Arizona Daily Star

1952 births
Living people
American expatriate baseball players in Japan
Baseball players from California
Caldwell Cubs players
Chicago Cubs players
Daytona Beach Explorers players
Kansas City Royals players
Major League Baseball first basemen
Major League Baseball outfielders
Midland Cubs players
Minor league baseball managers
Quincy Cubs players
San Antonio Missions players
Sportspeople from Burbank, California
St. Petersburg Pelicans players
Sun City Rays players
Tigres de Aragua players
American expatriate baseball players in Venezuela
Wichita Aeros players
Winter Haven Super Sox players
Yokohama Taiyō Whales players
American Association (1902–1997) MVP Award winners